The 1987–88 Coppa Italia was the 41st Coppa Italia, the major Italian domestic football cup. The competition was won by Sampdoria, who defeated Torino 3–2 on aggregate in a two-legged final played at Stadio Luigi Ferraris in Genoa and Stadio Comunale in Turin.

Group stage 
For this event changes were made to the regulations concerning the elimination rounds: 3 points for the winner, 2 points for the winner of penalty kicks, 1 point for the loser of penalty kicks.

Group 1

Group 2

Group 3

Group 4

Group 5

Group 6

Group 7

Group 8

Round of 16

Quarter-finals

Semi-finals

Final

First leg

Second leg

Sampdoria won 3–2 on aggregate.

Top goalscorers

References
rsssf.com

Coppa Italia seasons
Coppa Italia
Coppa Italia